Avon Township is a township in Coffey County, Kansas, United States. As of the 2000 census, its population was 183.

Geography
According to the USGS, it contains five cemeteries: Altamont, Center Hill, Pleasant Hill, Quisling and Saint Johns.

The streams of Badger Creek, Scott Creek, Silver Creek and Tauckett Creek run through this township.

References
 USGS Geographic Names Information System (GNIS)

External links
 US-Counties.com
 City-Data.com

Townships in Coffey County, Kansas
Townships in Kansas